Marshall Allen is an American journalist, who with Alex Richards, won the 2011 Goldsmith Prize for Investigative Reporting.

Life
He graduated from Fuller Theological Seminary, with a Master's degree in Theology.  
He served in Nairobi, Kenya.

He was a staff writer at the Pasadena Star-News, and the News-Press and Foothill Leader Newspapers.
He was a reporter for the Las Vegas Sun, from 2006 to 2011.
He was a 2009 Fellow of the Association of Health Care Journalists (AHCJ). 
The "Do No Harm" project was based on data mining, and analysing hospital records turned over to the State of Nevada.

He reports on Healthcare for ProPublica.

Works
"Do No Harm", Las Vegas Sun

References

External links
"Public Records: Marshall Allen on Why Journalists Should Play By Bureaucrats' Rules"
Marshall Allen talks ‘Do No Harm’ to JSchool Students
How a ProPublica reporter turned a telemarketing call into an investigative story
Former LA Reporter Beats ProPublica, Then Joins Them
journalist's Twitter

American male journalists
Living people
Fuller Theological Seminary alumni
Year of birth missing (living people)